Talis chamylella is a moth in the family Crambidae. It is found in the Tian Shan Mountains.

References

Ancylolomiini
Moths described in 1899
Moths of Asia